The 1925 Northwestern Wildcats team represented Northwestern University during the 1925 Big Ten Conference football season. In their fourth year under head coach Glenn Thistlethwaite, the Wildcats compiled a 5–3 record (3–1 against Big Ten Conference opponents) and finished in second place in the Big Ten Conference.

Schedule

References

Northwestern
Northwestern Wildcats football seasons
Northwestern Wildcats football